The Whakaki River is located in the Northland Region of New Zealand's North Island. Despite its name, it is better described as a silty arm of the Kaipara Harbour. It flows northwest to reach the Arapaoa River.

See also
List of rivers of New Zealand

References

Kaipara District
Rivers of the Northland Region
Rivers of New Zealand
Kaipara Harbour catchment